Vladimir Marín Ríos (born 26 September 1979) is a Colombian football attacking midfielder and coach. He plays for Obreros Unidos in the Liga Hernandariense. He represented Colombia from 2006 to 2009.

Club career
Marín began his playing career with local club, Deportivo Rionegro, before joining Bolivian side Jorge Wilstermann for four seasons. Then he moved to Clube Atlético Paranaense where he played for a year, before returning to Colombia to play for Atlético Nacional. Marín had a brief spell in the Argentine Primera with Club Atlético Independiente before transferring to Paraguay's Club Libertad in January 2007. In 2009, Marín was loaned to Toluca of Mexico where he won the Bicentenario 2010 league title.

Return to Paraguayan League

2016–2022: Primera División and Lower Leagues
In the 2018 División Intermedia season, Marin appeared for Sportivo Trinidense, with colleagues as Arístides Florentín, Claudio Centurion, Arturo Aquino, Eduardo Aveiro, Blas Irala, Jorge Achucarro, Gerardo Fleitas and South Korean Jang Hee-mang.

In October 2018, Marin signed with General Caballero Carapeguá for the 2018/19 Liga Carapegüeña. In November 2018, Marin debuted as captain for General Caballero Benín Loma in a 1–1 draw with Olimpia in the Liga Carapegüeña. In the team as well was Adalberto Gonzalez and Arístides Florentín. Marin's contract ran for the duration of the championship.

In January 2019, ABC Color announced that Marin signed with Encarnación team Athletic FBC to dispute the 2019 Primera B Nacional. He would summon to the pre-season works afterwards, due to commitments with his club from the Liga Carapegüeña, which was still in competition at the time.

In 2020, Marin joined Pedro Juan Caballero team Mariscal Estigarribia to play the 2020 Copa Paraguay.

In 2021, Marin joined General Caballero CG in the Paraguay's Primera C, scoring an olympic goal in September.

In November 2021, Marin joined Club Obreros Unidos from the Liga Hernandariense.

International career
In the 2007 Copa América in Venezuela, Marín was substituted onto the field in the 63st minute for Javier Arizala in a 5–0 group stage defeat against Paraguay.

Marín made several appearances for the Colombia national football team, including four qualifying matches for the 2010 FIFA World Cup. On 6 June 2009, Marín was yellow carded in a 1–0 away defeat against Argentina in a World Cup qualification game.

On 15 October 2009, Marín played his last game for Colombia in a 2–0 away victory against Paraguay in a World Cup qualification game.

Coaching career
In 2017, Marin exercised the Technical Direction of Sportivo Luqueño under-18 female team as league champions. The championship game was decided in a 4–3 penalty shoot out victory against Olimpia Asunción following a 3–3 draw during the 90 minutes of reglumentary time.

In January 2018, Marin was officially presented as Paraguay's women national team coach.

Personal life

Family and relationships
Marin's wife, Milena Narváez, who is the president of Sportivo Luqueño's Women's Team. In 2017, Marin's daughter, Maria Isabel Marín Narváez, was part of the Sportivo Luqueño U18 team when he was the coach.

See also
 List of expatriate footballers in Paraguay
 Players and Records in Paraguayan Football

References

External links

 Vladimir Marín at playmakerstats.com (English version of ceroacero.es)

1979 births
Living people
Colombian footballers
Colombia international footballers
2007 Copa América players
Association football midfielders
Paraguayan Primera División players
Liga MX players
Categoría Primera A players
Cienciano footballers
C.D. Jorge Wilstermann players
Club Athletico Paranaense players
Club Atlético Independiente footballers
Atlético Nacional footballers
Club Libertad footballers
Deportivo Toluca F.C. players
Club Olimpia footballers
Deportivo Cali footballers
Independiente Medellín footballers
Águilas Doradas Rionegro players
Colombian expatriate footballers
Expatriate footballers in Peru
Expatriate footballers in Bolivia
Expatriate footballers in Brazil
Expatriate footballers in Argentina
Expatriate footballers in Paraguay
Expatriate footballers in Mexico
Argentine Primera División players
Colombian expatriate sportspeople in Bolivia
Colombian expatriate sportspeople in Mexico
Colombian expatriate sportspeople in Argentina
Colombian expatriate sportspeople in Peru
People from Rionegro
Sportspeople from Antioquia Department